Zuma is a 2003 tile-matching puzzle video game developed by Oberon Media and published by PopCap Games. It was released for a number of platforms, including PDAs, mobile phones, and the iPod.

An enhanced version, called Zuma Deluxe, was released for Microsoft Windows and Mac OS X as well as an Xbox Live Arcade download for the Xbox 360 and a PlayStation Network download for the PlayStation 3. It is also included with the PlayStation 3 retail version of Bejeweled 3, along with Feeding Frenzy 2.

Zuma received the 2004 "Game of the Year" award from RealArcade.

Gameplay 
The objective of Zuma is to eliminate all of the balls rolling around the screen along a given path (the path is clearly visible in all of the levels except for the last level) with other balls before these balls reach the yellow skull structure, which will open to varying degrees as a warning of oncoming balls. The player can carry two balls at a time and can switch at any time. As soon as one ball reaches the skull, the others follow and the player loses a life. To prevent the balls from reaching the skull, the player can eliminate the balls by firing a colored ball from the stone frog idol's mouth towards the chain of balls that will continue to push forward until the player fills the yellow bar, which is when the balls will stop producing off-screen. When three or more of the same color come in contact, they explode, possibly triggering other explosions as part of a chain reaction. The level is completed when after the bar is filled, the player eliminates all of the balls on the screen.

There are bonuses for collecting coins (usually through gaps), for causing explosions through gaps of other balls, and chains for having a streak of always causing an explosion with each consecutive ball (coins and chain bonuses are a quick way to fill the bar). Time bonuses are also awarded if a player completes the level within ace timeranging from thirty seconds to four minutes depending on the level.

Four different types of power-ups show up in the balls, which can be activated by exploding the ball with the power-up. The backwards ball pushes the furthest-out chain (depending on if all of the balls are connected) backwards for a short length of time. The slow-down ball slows the speed of the chain of balls for a short length of time. The accuracy ball allows quicker shots and points an arrow at where the ball will be shot (this stays active for about the same amount of time as the slow-down ball; however, the size of the balls must be considered). The explosion ball explodes all of the balls within a small radius of the ball at the spot and time of its explosion. If not exploded quickly, power-up balls will return to their regular state after some time.

Adventure mode 
Each regular adventure begins with three lives (represented by frogs in the upper-left hand corner of the screen), but extra lives are earned with every 50,000 points. Shooting a coin with a ball, making multiple groups of balls explode with a single shot, earning chain bonuses, shooting through gaps in the balls, or finishing a level within a certain period of time (called ace time) will give extra points.

The levels are organized into temples, and the initial temple consists of three "worlds" of five levels each (the fifth level in each stage is unique in having two tracks of balls instead of the usual one). No level in the first world contains tunnels, and the first level of each world is tunnelless.

Worlds one to three have four colors of balls: red, blue, green, and yellow, worlds four to six add purple, and from world seven on, white is added in the variety. Levels are eventually added to worlds: The second temple, which contains worlds four to six, has six levels, while the third temple, which contains worlds seven to nine, has seven levels. The fourth and final temple (which is hidden until a player unlocks world ten for the first time) contains worlds ten to twelve, which also consists of seven levels each. Worlds ten to twelve are essentially the same as seven to nine, but for each level, 5,000 points must be scored to completely fill the Zuma bar. Also, the balls come out further at the start of the level, and the chain of balls moves along slightly faster. If the player loses all of their lives, the game ends, and they must start again at the beginning of the last stage they advanced up. However, if the player is able to beat all 12 worlds, they are taken to the 13th and final world where it has only one level which is the "Space" level where it is longer than all previous levels, has less color-grouping among the balls, and has no visible path for the balls to follow. This level and the 13th world cannot be accessed without first completing world twelve. Upon beating this level, the player wins the game (if a player fails to beat the Space level (13–1), they must beat all of world twelve again before getting another chance to win). All the remaining lives at the end of a game are each worth 50,000 additional points to add on to the final score.

Gauntlet mode 
Zuma also offers the gauntlet mode, where a player can choose to play in a level they have already reached in adventure mode, and either practice to beat the level, or play in survival mode, where the difficulty in colors and speed of balls will gradually increase. The level classifications of the gauntlet mode, in order, are Rabbit, Eagle, Jaguar, and Sun God. A player is required to fill seven stages in practice mode or seven yellow bars in survival mode before advancing to the next level. Upon reaching Sun God, in which the balls move in constant speed even when nearing the skull, a player can continue endlessly, since the level classification has no limit in both stages and bars.

Plagiarism controversy

The Japanese developer Mitchell Corporation claims Zuma infringes on the intellectual property of their 1998 arcade game, Puzz Loop, which was released as Ballistic outside Japan. Mitchell re-released the design in 2006 as the Nintendo DS game Magnetica. PopCap asserted that Zuma was "not an exact clone", with PopCap founder Jason Kapalka saying that he was "happy" with the idea of games being cloned by other developers, so long as the new version added to the gameplay of the game it had copied.

Reception 

The editors of Computer Gaming World nominated Zuma for their 2003 "Puzzle Game of the Year" award, which ultimately went to Bookworm. They wrote: "From Bejeweled to Rocket Mania to Zuma, PopCap has constantly found new ways to spell 'addiction.

The editors of Computer Gaming World nominated Zuma Deluxe as their 2004 "Arcade Classic of the Year", although it lost to Sid Meier's Pirates!.

Legacy
A sequel, Zuma's Revenge!, was launched on September 15, 2009, for Windows and Mac. Zuma Blitz went live on Facebook on December 14, 2010, and was described by PopCap as "the social adaptation" providing players with "the first competitive and cooperative iteration of Zuma in the game's history".

See also
 Luxor
 Tumblebugs

References

2003 video games
Casual games
Electronic Arts franchises
IOS games
IPod games
MacOS games
Tile-matching video games
Mobile games
Original Xbox Live Arcade games
Palm OS games
PlayStation 2 games
PlayStation 3 games
PlayStation Network games
PlayStation Portable games
PopCap games
Single-player video games
Video game clones
Video games developed in the United States
Video games involved in plagiarism controversies
Windows games
Windows Mobile Professional games
Xbox 360 Live Arcade games
J2ME games
Glu Mobile games
Oberon Media games